Aliyu Okechukwu (born September 5, 1995) is a Nigerian footballer who plays as an attacking midfielder for NK Rudeš in Croatia.

Club career

Rijeka
Okechukwu was one of several players who moved from the Nigerian Abuja Football College Academy to the HNK Rijeka Academy in 2013. Following his arrival to Rijeka, in mid-2013, he picked up the most valuable player award at the 61st international Kvarnerska Rivijera tournament. In September 2013, Okechukwu signed a -year contract with HNK Rijeka that ties him with the club until June 2016. During the same month, his leg was fractured during a youth tournament match in Ljubljana.

Pomorac (loan)
Following his recovery from injury, in early 2014, he was loaned to NK Pomorac in 2. HNL together with his compatriot Theophilus Solomon. He made his professional début in a home draw against NK Solin on 2 April 2014. At Pomorac, he made eight appearances without finding the net.

Rijeka II
Following his return from loan in mid-2014, Okechukwu played for Rijeka II in 3. HNL, scoring two goals in 14 appearances.

Zadar (loan)
In January 2015, Okechukwu was loaned to Zadar until the end of the 2014–15 1. HNL season, where he once again joined Solomon. He made 9 appearances with the club before the end of his loan.

Šibenik (loan)
Following their spell with Zadar, in July 2015, Okechukwu and Solomon, joined by another Nigerian David Nwolokor, were sent on a season-long loan to HNK Šibenik in 2. HNL. Okechukwu was a regular starter in the first half of the season. However, he sustained an injury during mid-season training and consequently missed the second half of the season.

RNK Split
In June 2016, Okechukwu was transferred to RNK Split.

Istra 1961
Following a season with RNK Split, in July 2017, Okechukwu moved to NK Istra 1961.

References

External links

1995 births
Living people
Nigerian footballers
Nigerian expatriate footballers
Association football forwards
HNK Rijeka players
HNK Rijeka II players
NK Pomorac 1921 players
NK Zadar players
HNK Šibenik players
RNK Split players
NK Istra 1961 players
NK Rudeš players
Croatian Football League players
First Football League (Croatia) players
Expatriate footballers in Croatia
Nigerian expatriate sportspeople in Croatia